Arruns Tarquinius was the second son of Lucius Tarquinius Superbus, the seventh and last King of Rome.

History
During his father's reign, he accompanied his elder brother, Titus, and their cousin, Lucius Junius Brutus, to consult the Oracle at Delphi regarding an omen witnessed by the king.  After she had interpreted the omen, the princes asked the Oracle who should succeed their father as king; her reply was that he who should first kiss his mother upon their return would succeed the king.  While Titus and Arruns assumed that this meant their actual mother, Brutus correctly intuited that mother earth was intended, and so deliberately stumbled and fell upon the trio's return to Italy.

Following the overthrow of the monarchy in 509 BC, Titus and Arruns went with their father to Caere, while Brutus was elected one of the first consuls.  After the first unsuccessful attempt by the Tarquins to regain the throne in 509, Arruns commanded the Etruscan cavalry at the Battle of Silva Arsia.  Having spied from afar the lictors, and thereby recognising the presence of a consul, Arruns soon saw that his cousin Brutus was in command of the Roman cavalry.  The two men charged each other, and were each speared to death.  The battle ended in a Roman victory, and the Tarquins remained in exile.

Later literature
 In Inferno, the first part of the Divine Comedy of Dante Alighieri, Arruns appears in the fourth bolgia of the Eighth circle of hell, together with sorcerers, astrologers and false prophets.

See also
Stemma Tarquiniorum (family tree of the Tarquinii)

Notes

References
 Ovid Fast. 2.725ff. 
 Dionys., iii, 46 
 William Smith (ed.) (1870), Dictionary of Greek and Roman Biography and Mythology, Vol. 1 p. 378, #1. 
 The Early History of Rome: Books I-V of The History of Rome from Its Foundations by Livy, Aubrey De Sélincourt, Stephen P. Oakley, p. 72, 
 

Etruscans
Characters in Roman mythology
Tarquinii
Ancient Romans killed in action
Children of Lucius Tarquinius Superbus
Sons of Roman kings